The American Osteopathic Board of Pediatrics (AOBP) is an organization that provides board certification to qualified Doctors of Osteopathic Medicine (D.O.) who specialize in the diagnosis and treatment of medical diseases in infants, children, and adolescents (pediatricians). The board is one 18 medical specialty certifying boards of the American Osteopathic Association Bureau of Osteopathic Specialists approved by the American Osteopathic Association (AOA), and was established in 1940. As of December 2011, 477 osteopathic pediatricians held active certification with the AOBP. Fellows of the AOBP are eligible for membership in the American Academy of Pediatrics along with fellows of the American Board of Pediatrics.

Board certification
Osteopathic pediatricians are eligible for initial certification if they have successfully completed an AOA-approved residency in pediatrics, an AOA membership that is in good standing, an unrestricted medical license in the state in which their practice is located, and must complete the required AOBP examinations.

Prior to 1995, the American Osteopathic Board of Pediatrics offered lifetime certificates to members recognized as board certified. However, the American Osteopathic Board of Pediatrics now requires osteopathic pediatricians to renew their certification every ten years to avoid expiration of their board certification status.

Osteopathic pediatricians may receive Certification of Special Qualifications in the following areas: 
Adolescent and Young Adult Medicine
Neonatology
Pediatric Allergy/Immunology
Pediatric Endocrinology

Additionally, a Certification of Added Qualifications is available in Sports Medicine to diplomates of the AOBP.

See also
American Osteopathic Association Bureau of Osteopathic Specialists

References

External links
AOBP homepage

Osteopathic medical associations in the United States
Organizations established in 1940
Medical and health professional associations in Chicago
Pediatric organizations